Qatargate is an ongoing political scandal, involving allegations that European Parliament officials, lobbyists and their families have been influenced by the governments of Qatar, Morocco and Mauritania, engaging in corruption, money laundering, and organized crime. Law enforcement authorities in Belgium, Italy and Greece seized €1.5 million in cash, confiscated computers and mobile phones, and charged four individuals with the alleged offences.

Allegations and events leading up to the arrests
The legal case in the Qatargate is still to be decided. According to the testimony of Francesco Giorgi, starting 2019, Qatar has channeled cash to Antonio Panzeri and Eva Kaili.
Panzeri, a former member of the European Parliament, and Kaili, a sitting member, were trying to influence voting at the European Parliament in favour of Qatar. Bribes in relation to Qatar, as well as the Mauritanian government, were according to Francesco Giorgi channeled through a Brussels-based organization co-founded by Panzeri called Fight Impunity. 

Kaili and Panzeri would have been part of a larger scheme, the extent of which is still being investigated, aimed at influencing decisions by the European Parliament in favour of Qatar. 
Giorgi is Kaili's partner and former parliamentary advisor to Panzeri, his testimony contradicts in some points the testimony of Panzeri. Panzeri put forward in his leaked interview with the Belgian authorities that first cash payments were received from Morocco, before Qatar was involved. The important leaks of the testimonies in the case are causing legal concerns for the Belgian authorties in their efforts to investigate.

Kaili's actions have attracted suspicion among the members of her  S&D party even before her arrest. The Dutch lawmakers Lara Wolters who was sitting in the European Parliament for the same political group as Kaili, described the modus operandi of Kaili in an interview with the podcast EU Scream. Kaili would try to stop Wolters from expressing views critical of Qatar in discussions at the European Parliament. Kaili's last known action in favour of Qatar before her arrest was to vote in favour of a report advocating for visa-free travel to the EU for Qatari citizens. Kaili's vote was against internal rules of the European Parliament, according to its German member Gabriele Bischoff and the ostensible violation of the rules raised ever more questions among the members of Kaili's political party at the European Parliament.

Investigation, raids and arrests
In July 2022, the Central Office for the Repression of Corruption (OCRC, CDBC), a unit of the Belgian Federal Police, opened an investigation into an alleged criminal organisation. The investigation was led by the investigating magistrate Michel Claise, who works with the GRECO.

Acting on the investigation, on 9 December 2022, Belgian police executed 20 raids at 19 different addresses across Brussels in connection with the conspiracy and made eight arrests across Belgium and Italy. The homes and offices of the suspects were searched, including offices within the premises of the European Parliament buildings in Brussels. In line with the Belgian Constitution, the President of the European Parliament, Roberta Metsola, was required to return from her home in Malta to be present for the search at the properties of Eva Kaili and Marc Tarabella who held diplomatic immunity as MEPs.

The first arrest occurred at Sofitel hotel at Place Jourdan in Brussels where investigators arrested Eva Kaili's father, Alexandros. Investigators found a suitcase with "several hundred thousand euros" on his person as he attempted to flee. Investigating judge Michel Claise deemed the arrest in flagrante delicto– or caught in the act. This led to Kaili losing her diplomatic immunity, which had thus far prevented investigators raiding Kaili's property. Kaili's property was subsequently searched. Around a dozen police officers as well as judge Claise searched her apartment and arrested Kaili. Kaili did not resist, but she was "in a state of shock and confusion, crying and terrified" according to reports.  Kaili was then interrogated for more than five hours.

Included in the raids were locations linked to Antonio Panzeri, an Italian former MEP. Upon searching his home, police found a large quantity of cash in his "well-stocked safe". At the same time investigators raided the offices of the international NGO Fight Impunity, an organisation set up to promote the fight against impunity for serious violations of human rights and crimes against humanity, of which Panzeri is the president.

After the conclusion of the Brussels raids, police had arrested Eva Kaili; Antonio Panzeri; Francesco Giorgi, Kaili's life partner and an adviser of the Italian MEP Andrea Cozzolino; Alexandros Kailis, Kaili's father and former Greek politician; Luca Visentini, general secretary of the International Trade Union Confederation (ITUC); Niccolò Figà-Talamanca, Secretary-General of the NGO No Peace Without Justice; and an unnamed assistant of the Italian MEP Alessandra Moretti. €600,000 in cash was reportedly found at Panzeri's home with additional cash being found at Kaili's father's home, his hotel room and the home shared by Kaili and Giorgi. In total, the combined amount of cash found in the raids totalled €1.5million. Following Kaili's arrest she was detained at the  until her transfer after five days to Haren Prison.

In addition to the searches of properties belonging to those who were arrested, searches were also carried out at the homes of four Parliamentary assistants (Federica Garbagnati, Giuseppe Meroni, Donatella Rostagno and Davide Zoggia), among others, but these raids did not result in arrests. Garbagnati, Rostagno and Zoggia are assistants to the MEPs Alessandra Moretti, Marie Arena and Pietro Bartolo, while Meroni works as assistant to Lara Comi. Other raids took place at the homes of two undisclosed advisors and one European Parliament official.

As the raids were being carried out in Brussels, the Italian State Police executed two European Arrest Warrants across Italy. Maria Colleoni, Panzeri's wife, was arrested at their family home in Calusco d'Adda, close to Bergamo, Italy, and his daughter, Silvia Panzeri, was arrested later that evening in Milan. Both women were transferred to a Bergamo prison for detention. As of 14 December, the two women had been released under house arrest to a property in Lombardy. Shortly thereafter, Italian authorities carried out a raid at the Italian home of Giorgi where an additional €20,000 in cash was confiscated.

The European Arrest Warrant confirmed reports of that the charges against Panzeri related to corruption and gift he had received from nation-states. The publication of the warrant was the first time the state of Morocco was implicated in the scandal.
 
The day following the raids, on 10 December, a further search was carried out at the home of the vice chair of the European Parliament's delegation for relations with the Arab Peninsula, the Belgian MEP Marc Tarabella; Tarabella was not arrested.

On 12 December 2022, it was announced that the Greek Anti-Money Laundering Authority had frozen all of Kaili's assets and those of close family members. This includes all of Kaili's bank accounts, safes, companies and any other financial assets. According to the head of the Anti-Money Laundering Authority, a newly established estate agency in Kolonaki (an upmarket neighbourhood of Athens) was of particular interest to the authorities. Additionally, Greek authorities seized a 7,000 square-metre  plot of land bought jointly by Kaili and Giorgi on Paros, Greece in the Cyclades islands.

As the European Parliament convened for the first time following the scandal, on 13 December 2022 at its seat in Strasbourg in France, the offices of Pietro Bartolo MEP and the Parliamentary official Mychelle Rieu were both sealed by investigators.

On 15 December the European Public Prosecutor's Office (EPPO) requested the European Parliament to lift its diplomatic immunity from Kaili and her fellow Greek MEP Maria Spyraki; the EPPO stated that the request was based on an investigative report received from the European Anti-Fraud Office (OLAF) regarding "suspicion of fraud detrimental to the EU budget, in relation to the management of the parliamentary allowance", specifically regarding money paid to parliamentary assistants.

On 2 January 2023, Belgian investigators submitted a request to the European Parliament to strip MEPs Marc Tarabella and Andrea Cozzolino of their diplomatic immunity. A hearing of the Parliament's Legal Affairs Committee was scheduled during the parliamentary sitting in Strasbourg on 16 January, allowing the accused MEPs to make their case. Both Tarabella and Cozzolino parties announce support to the President Metsola requests to assist the European Public Prosecutor's Office in investigations and vote to waive them immunity. Both Tarabella and Cozzolino vote in favour of the request for waiver of immunity, approved by the European Parliament on February 2.

Both Tarabella and Cozzolino have been arrested on charges of corruption, money-laundering and participation in a criminal organization under arrest warrants issued on 10 February 2023. MEPs Marie Arena and Alessandra Moretti are mentioned in the arrest warrants which claim the four were a "quadrumvirate" acting on the instructions of Panzeri. Arena and Moretti deny the allegations and both currently have legal immunity.

Involvement of Morocco 
Belgian Justice Minister Vincent Van Quickenborne described Morocco as a nation known for inferring in the EU. He said the investigation was focusing on multiple subjects, including the EU-Morocco trade agreements and the fisheries agreement.

A report by the Financial Times revealed that the Pier Antonio Panzeri received bribes, gifts and luxury hotel stays from the Moroccan government. The former Italian MEP had ties with Moroccan officials since he was the head of the European Parliament's EU-Maghreb delegation. Records revealed that during his time in the parliament Panzeri supported decisions favoring the Moroccan government. He had raised a request to the European Commission for allocation of more funds for Morocco, and also voted in favor of Morocco's trade agreement with the EU and the fisheries agreement. Panzeri received secret payments from Morocco's ambassador to Poland Abderrahim Atmoun through the NGOs.

In 2014, Moroccan King Mohammed VI awarded Panzeri with the third class "wissam" Alaoui for his services to Rabat.

In September 2022, 4 Brussels MPs, including David  Leisterh, David Weytsman, Clémentine Barzin, and Gaëtan Van Goidsenhoven, visited the city of Laâyoune in Western Sahara. The Morrocan parliament had invited the MEPs and paid for the entire trip. Western Sahara is a disputed region, which Morocco claims to be its own. However, after the Belgium investigation opened, the MEPs' trip came under greater scrutiny.

Trial and prosecution
The four charged suspects, Kaili, Panzeri, Giorgi and Figà-Talamanca, were scheduled to appear at the Palais de Justice, Brussels, the country's primary law courts, on 14 December for arraignment proceedings. Three of the four suspects appeared in court, but strike action by prison staff prevented Kaili's appearance; her appearance was rescheduled for 22 December 2022. Panzeri and Giorgi were both remanded into custody pending further investigation. Kaili's postponed hearing was eventually heard in a closed session at the Palais de Justice on 22 December from where she was remanded in custody for at least another month despite her appeal for conditional release under electronic supervision. Figà-Talamanca was initially to be released from custody on the condition that he wear an electronic monitoring ankle bracelet, but the decision was overturned on 27 December 2022 after the prosecutors appealed. A hearing involving Panzeri was postponed at his own request to 17 January 2023.

Giorgi confessed on 15 December 2022 to having been bribed by Qatari officials to influence the European Parliament's decisions. He also confessed receiving funds from the Moroccan government, and while exonerating his partner, Kaili, he explicitly implicated the involvement of Panzeri, Cozzolino, and Tarabella.

Visentini admitted on 20 December to receiving two payments from Fight Impunity for €50,000 and €60,000 but claimed the donations were contributions toward his campaign to become General-Secretary of ITUC and not to "influence [ITUC's] position on Qatar or on any other issues".

On 16 January 2023 an Italian court approved the extradition of Silvia Panzeri, daughter of Pier Antonio.

In January 2023 Panzeri pleaded guilty to his part of the conspiracy as part of a plea deal with the Belgian authorities. As part of the deal Panzeri will reveal the identities of those he bribed as well as those  he conspired with. It is foreseen he will receive a sentence of five years of which four would be suspended. The remaining year would be served in prison or with an electronic bracelet, or a combination of both. This was only the second time that Belgian prosecutors have made a plea deal as they were previously not permissible in law.

The German magazine Der Spiegel was given access to over 1,300 documents from the Belgian investigation. According to these documents, Panzeri's group received payment in cash from Qatar, Morocco, Mauritania and possibly Saudi Arabia. The group are described as "shockingly amateurish", because they stored the money they received in bribes in their apartments, made hundreds of unencrypted telephone calls and held a "held a conspiratorial meeting in a hotel that was full of surveillance cameras". Nevertheless, they operated undetected for years. Green Party MEP Viola von Cramon-Taubadel said that Kazakhstan, Azerbaijan and Russia also "systematically purchased influence over an extended period".

Reactions

Political
Immediately following the arrests, strong reactions of condemnation of Vice-President Kaili came from around the European Union. After the story was first reported by Belgian media, the President of the European Parliament, Roberta Metsola, stated that the European Parliament had been complying with an ongoing investigation, without specifying its nature. Immediately following the arrests, both PASOK, Kaili's political party in Greece, and the Socialists and Democrats Group inside the European Parliament announced Kaili's suspension from their respective parties. Two days following the arrests, Metsola suspended Kaili's responsibilities and powers as a Vice-President of the European Parliament. Three days later, in a vote of the full chamber, Kaili was officially removed as vice president by a supermajority.

At the opening of the first meeting of the European Parliament following the raids, on 12 December President Metsola announced that all work with Qatar would be suspended. The suspension of Parliamentary business at such a time was significant as it comes just three days before the Parliament was due to vote on introducing a visa-free travel agreement with Qatar and other countries. This resulted in the vote on visa-free travel to Ecuador, Kuwait, and Oman also being cancelled. In addition, a major and controversial air transit agreement that would have allowed Qatar Airways unlimited access to the EU market was put on hold after warning that Qatar may have interfered in Parliament's internal deliberations on the agreement. During the negotiations there was criticism by EU member states that the agreement, negotiated by the Parliament's transport committee, was unduly favourable to Qatar. Later the full chamber voted to suspend all work on files involving Qatar in a 541–2 vote, with three abstentions.
At the same meeting the Greens–European Free Alliance and Renew Europe both called for an inquiry committee to be set up by the European Parliament. In an vote of the chamber, the Parliament adopted a resolution creating a Committee of Inquiry into the affair.

Ahead of the opening of the plenary discussion several MEPs in the Socialists and Democrats Group stepped down from positions within the Parliament. Marc Tarabella suspended himself from the S&D group entirely, Marie Arena stood down as the Chair of the Parliament's human rights committee, Pietro Bartolo suspended his position as group spokesman on visa liberalisation and Andrea Cozzolino suspended his role as group spokesman on urgencies. Tarabella was later suspended by his national party, the Walloon Socialist Party.

The chair of the Parliamentary EU–Qatar Friendship Group, José Ramón Bauzá MEP, announced the suspension of the group following the revelation. In a statement Bauzá said that he was doing so "in view of the very serious events of the last few days, and until we get to the bottom of the matter".

The European People's Party (EPP), the largest political group inside the Parliament, took the decision to suspend all foreign policy work relating to all matters external to the European Union until the integrity of the procedure could be ensured. The EPP encouraged other parties to follow suit.

Dino Giarrusso MEP reported that he and others had been approached by Qatari officials many times: "They were hoping to improve the country's reputation especially in the run-up to the FIFA World Cup". A resolution by Manon Aubry condemning the exploitation of migrant workers in Qatar had stalled in the Parliament for more than one year before passing, due to opposition from the S&D and EPP group.

After the scandal broke out, several media organisations noted that Kaili had visited Qatar one month before the scandal, meeting with the Qatari Minister of Labour Ali bin Samikh Al Marri; upon her return to Brussels, she had praised Qatar as a "frontrunner in labour rights" in a speech in front of the European Parliament.

Ursula von der Leyen, President of the European Commission, accused Qatar of seeking to buy influence in the European Parliament chamber and that it was of the "utmost concern". Von der Leyen called for a body to be created to uphold the rules on integrity and ethics across all EU institutions. The former President of the European Parliament and current European Commissioner responsible for Foreign Affairs and Security, Josep Borrell, was quoted as saying "the news is very worrisome, very, very worrisome. We are facing some events, some facts that certainly worry me. [We] have to act according to not only to the facts but to the ... evidence. I am sure you understand that these are very grave accusations." The European Ombudsman, Emily O'Reilly, was, however critical of the response of Von der Leyen and fellow politicians and institutions, highlighting the lack of progress shown by von der Leyen following her pledge that transparency would be a core part of her mandate when she became European Commission President. O'Reilly called for a body to be created with real investigatory and sanctions powers.

The Belgian Prime Minister, Alexander De Croo, was also critical of the European institutions in his response, stating that "Belgian justice is doing what, at first sight, the European Parliament hasn't done." "The European Parliament has a lot of means to regulate itself. It turns out that this is largely a system of auto-control based on voluntary efforts, which has clearly not been sufficient."

Annalena Baerbock, the German Minister for Foreign Affairs, highlighted that the scandal is leading to concerns from citizens and affects the credibility and legitimacy of the institutions of the European Union.

On 15 December the European People's Party (EPP) reacted by declaring, "We need to discuss hypocrisy ... This is an S&D scandal." In an attempt to focus the scandal on the Progressive Alliance of Socialists and Democrats Group (S&D), rather than the European Parliament as a whole, they continued, "There has been a consistent effort to turn #Qatargate into an institutional issue alone. But this scandal is not an orphan. ... It has an address. And that's the S&D Group." One of the assistants whose flats were searched (Giuseppe Meroni) works for the EPP member Lara Comi, and the EPP member Maria Spyraki was later also put under investigation by the European Public Prosecutor's Office (EPPO).

Civil society
Reactions also came from European civil society organisations. Transparency International described the incident as "the most egregious case" of alleged corruption the European Parliament has ever seen. The founder of the Good Lobby commented that "[w]hatever its final outcome, [the] Qatar 'corruption' scandal has unveiled an inconvenient, and for most Europeans already obvious, truth. Money does buy influence in the EU", and that "[t]he EU Parliament and most of its members have historically resisted stricter integrity rules and [an] effective enforcement system."

As news broke of the investigation, the honorary board of the implicated NGO, Fight Impunity, resigned en masse. The board members included high-profile European policymakers including Federica Mogherini (former EU High Representative in the Juncker Commission), Bernard Cazeneuve (formerly Prime Minister of France), Dimitris Avramopoulos (former EU Commissioner for Migration, Home Affairs and Citizenship in the Juncker Commission), Cecilia Wikström (former MEP) and Emma Bonino (former EU Commissioner for Health and Consumer Protection in the Santer Commission). The honorary board has no executive or managerial role, so there is no suspicion or accusations against any member of the board.

Visentini originally voluntarily stood down temporarily as president of the International Trade Union Congress but a specially convened Extraordinary Meeting of the General Council voted to suspend him of all of his duties. ITUC stated their "total opposition" to all forms of corruption and "where corruption exists, workers are among its principal victims". ITUC stated that their decision to suspend Visentini "This in no way implies any presumption of guilt."

Government of Qatar
The Qatari government denied any involvement in the scandal with the Qatari Mission to the European Union saying, "[t]he State of Qatar categorically rejects any attempts to associate it with accusations of misconduct. Any association of the Qatari government with the reported claims is baseless and gravely misinformed. The State of Qatar works through institution -to-institution engagement and operates in full compliance with international laws and regulations." They later accused the United Arab Emirates (UAE) of orchestrating the scandal. Journalist Jack Parrock reported that the Qatari government claimed "everyone" believed that the UAE was behind it. According to the Qatari state-funded Middle East Monitor "[t]he European Union Parliament has opened an official investigation into corruption cases and suspicions involving senior officials from the United Arab Emirates (UAE) to launch a smear campaign against Qatar coinciding with hosting the 2022 FIFA World Cup." Qatar claims that "since 2017, Qatar feels it has been the victim of a media attack orchestrated by Abu Dhabi, with false documents and fake news."

The Qatari Government stated that they were being "exclusively criticised and attacked" by Belgian authorities and conveyed disappointment that the Belgian government "made no effort to engage with our government to establish the facts".

Qatar warned that the continued implication of Qatar in the scandal will "negatively effect" the energy cooperation between the EU and Qatar.

Defendants

Eva Kaili 
Kaili denied any wrongdoing in the controversy. Her lawyers appeared on Greek TV stating, "[h]er position is that she is innocent, she has nothing to do with bribery from Qatar". Kaili's lawyers were also critical of her arrest as a "gross overreach of judicial power". They maintain that Kaili was in a state of shock, fear and confusion during her first interview and that she was not provided with an interpreter for the interview. According to her lawyers, it took a week for Kaili to be in "good enough psychological condition to be fully aware of what she was saying".
Kaili reportedly felt "very troubled" and betrayed by her partner, Giorgi, according to her lawyers. 

Kaili has accused the Belgian authorities of "inhuman" behavior due to the Belgian authorities refusal to allow her to see her daughter in person or via Skype. Kaili said: "I am being tortured, this is so unfair that I cannot stand it, and I am breaking down. What is the problem with my little girl, why are they keeping her away from me?". The following day a three-hour meeting between Kaili and her daughter was authorised. The court decided on 16 February 2023 to keep Kaili in detention for another two months. Kaili had changed her Belgian lawyer from André Risopoulo to Sven Mary some time before the hearing. Mary had "represented one of the terrorists behind the 2015 Paris attacks".

Francesco Giorgi 
Former parliamentary assistant and domestic partner of accused Eva Kaili was arrested in December 2022 before being released with an electronic tag in February 2023 having agreed a deal with the prosecutor to reveal details of the illegal organisation.

Luca Visentini 
Following Visentini's conditional release on Sunday 11 December 2022, in a statement issued through the ITUC, he replied to the allegations by proclaiming his innocence and "reconfirming his absolutely commit[ment] to the fight against corruption" He also commented specifically on his confession in relation to receiving two payments from the NGO Fight Impunity of €50,000 and €60,000 by stating the monies were in relation to his campaign to become the General-Secretary of ITUC and that "it was in no way connected to a corruption attempt or aimed at influencing my position on Qatar."

Antonio Panzeri 
As part of Panzeri's plea deal he confirmed the involvement of Qatar and Morocco in the scandal, and admitted to being a leader of the criminal enterprise. Panzeri had pledged to share "substantial, revealing" information after reaching a repentance agreement with the Belgian Prosecutor.

Niccolò Figà-Talamanca 
Niccolò Figà-Talamanca, the secretary-general of the NGO No Peace Without Justice,  was one of the original four suspects arrested in the case. On 14 December 2022, Figà-Talamanca was released from prison with an electronic bracelet to track his movements, but the Belgian federal prosecutor successfully appealed the order on 27 December 2022, so Figà-Talamanca went back to prison. Figà-Talamanca was released from prison without conditions by the investigative judge at a hearing on 3 February 2023. Figà-Talamanca's lawyer at the hearings was Barbara Huylebroek. According to a member of his family, Figà-Talamanca remains charged.

Marc Tarabella 
On 2 February 2023, the European Parliament removed Marc Tarabella's legal immunity; Tarabella was present and voted. Marc Tarabella was arrested on 10 February 2023 in Anthisnes where he is mayor. On 11 February, he was charged with corruption, money laundering, and participation in a criminal organisation, and incarcerated in Prison de Saint-Gilles. Tarabella's lawyer, Maxim Töller, has asked for the dismissal of the investigating judge, Michel Claise, on the grounds that "the judge clearly seems to take for granted the contested facts that are the subject of the investigation he is leading." On 20 February, the Federal Prosecutor's Office said that Claise opposed Töller's recusal motion, so the Federal Prosecutor's Office is obliged to refer Töller's motion to the Brussels Court of Appeal, who have eight days to decide whether or not the investigating judge should be removed from the case.

Andrea Cozzolino 
Andrea Cozzolino's legal immunity was also removed by the European Parliament on 2 February 2023, when Andrea Cozzolino was in Italy. Cozzolino's lawyer Dimitri De Béco issued a statement that Cozzolino opposed being extradited to Belgium, because of the Belgian justice "way of proceeding". Cozzolino has repeatedly denied any wrong-doing. On 14 February, a Naples court granted a request from Cozzolino's lawyers to postpone the extradition hearing to 28 February so that the court could check the prison in Belgium that Cozzolino would be put in if extradited.

See also 
 Foreign relations of Qatar
 Azerbaijani laundromat, a complex money laundering scheme for money used to pay off European politicians.
 Caviar diplomacy, a lobbying strategy of Azerbaijan, consisting of costly invitations to foreign politicians.
 Russian Laundromat, possibly world's largest money-laundering scheme.

Notes

References

2022 scandals
2022 in international relations
2022 in Europe
2022 in Belgium
2022 in Greece
2022 in Italy
2022 in Morocco
2022 in Qatar
December 2022 events in Asia
December 2022 events in Europe
Corruption in Europe
Political scandals
European Parliament
Corruption scandal
Corruption scandal
Corruption scandal
Corruption scandal